Carl Ludwig II, 5th Prince of Hohenlohe-Langenburg (25 October 182916 May 1907), was the eldest son of Ernst I, Prince of Hohenlohe-Langenburg. He was the fifth Prince of Hohenlohe-Langenburg.

Early life
Carl Ludwig II was born at Langenburg, then in the Kingdom of Württemberg, as the first child of Ernst I, Prince of Hohenlohe-Langenburg (1794–1860; son of Karl Ludwig, Prince of Hohenlohe-Langenburg and Countess Amalie Henriette of Solms-Baruth) and his wife, Princess Feodora of Leiningen (1807–1872), daughter of Emich Carl, 2nd Prince of Leiningen and Princess Victoria of Saxe-Coburg-Saalfeld. His mother was the half-sister of Queen Victoria.

Education and military career
After living in Dresden and Gotha for educational purposes, he studied three semesters of law at the Friedrich Wilhelm University in Berlin (1850–51). He then spent several years in Langenburg to prepare for his upcoming role as a nobleman. It was not until the mid-1850s that he struck a military career in the Austrian army, later the Württemberg Army, although he was appointed in 1848 to Württemberg Officer.

Prince of Hohenlohe-Langenburg
At the death of his father on 12 April 1860, Carl Ludwig inherited the title, Prince of Hohenlohe-Langenburg. He renounced the title on 21 April 1860 in favour of his younger brother Hermann, after he intended to marry unequally. However, he retained the title of Prince.

Marriage and issue
Carl Ludwig was married morganatically on 22 February 1861 in Paris to Maria Grathwohl (1837–1901), eldest daughter of Georg Andreas Grathwohl and his wife, Friederike Meyer. His wife, unable to share his title, was created Baroness von Bronn in the nobility of Württemberg, the title being made heritable for all their children and legitimate male-line descendants.

They had three children:

 Baron Carl von Bronn (25 January 1862 – 28 September 1925); in 1911, he was elevated to the title of Prince von Weikersheim by Emperor Franz Joseph I of Austria, for civil services rendered to the Austrian empire. His descendants were made Counts and Countesses von Weikersheim. He married Countess Marie Czernin von und zu Chudenitz in 1899, and they had issue.
 Baroness Viktoria von Bronn (8 January 1863 – 10 October 1946), married in 1879 Ernst Ritter von Manner und Mätzelsdorf, no issue.
 Baroness Beatrix von Bronn (14 October 1868 – 17 April 1932)

Ancestry

Notes and sources

Genealogisches Handbuch des Adels, Fürstliche Häuser, Reference: 1956

1829 births
1907 deaths
People from Langenburg
House of Hohenlohe-Langenburg
Princes of Hohenlohe-Langenburg